Stasimopus is a genus of African mygalomorph spiders that was first described by Eugène Louis Simon in 1892. It is the only genus in the family Stasimopidae.

Species
 it contains forty-five species and two subspecies, found in southern Africa:
Stasimopus artifex Pocock, 1902 – South Africa
Stasimopus astutus Pocock, 1902 – South Africa
Stasimopus bimaculatus Purcell, 1903 – South Africa
Stasimopus brevipalpis Purcell, 1903 – South Africa
Stasimopus caffrus (C. L. Koch, 1842) (type) – South Africa
Stasimopus castaneus Purcell, 1903 – South Africa
Stasimopus coronatus Hewitt, 1915 – South Africa
Stasimopus dreyeri Hewitt, 1915 – South Africa
Stasimopus erythrognathus Purcell, 1903 – South Africa
Stasimopus filmeri Engelbrecht & Prendini, 2012 – South Africa
Stasimopus fordi Hewitt, 1927 – South Africa
Stasimopus gigas Hewitt, 1915 – South Africa
Stasimopus griswoldi Engelbrecht & Prendini, 2012 – South Africa
Stasimopus hewitti Engelbrecht & Prendini, 2012 – South Africa
Stasimopus insculptus Pocock, 1901 – South Africa
Stasimopus i. peddiensis Hewitt, 1917 – South Africa
Stasimopus kentanicus Purcell, 1903 – South Africa
Stasimopus kolbei Purcell, 1903 – South Africa
Stasimopus leipoldti Purcell, 1902 – South Africa
Stasimopus longipalpis Hewitt, 1917 – South Africa
Stasimopus mandelai Hendrixson & Bond, 2004 – South Africa
Stasimopus maraisi Hewitt, 1914 – South Africa
Stasimopus meyeri (Karsch, 1879) – Southeast Africa
Stasimopus minor Hewitt, 1915 – South Africa
Stasimopus nanus Tucker, 1917 – South Africa
Stasimopus nigellus Pocock, 1902 – South Africa
Stasimopus obscurus Purcell, 1908 – South Africa
Stasimopus oculatus Pocock, 1897 – South Africa
Stasimopus palpiger Pocock, 1902 – South Africa
Stasimopus patersonae Hewitt, 1913 – South Africa
Stasimopus poweri Hewitt, 1915 – South Africa
Stasimopus purcelli Tucker, 1917 – South Africa
Stasimopus quadratimaculatus Purcell, 1903 – South Africa
Stasimopus qumbu Hewitt, 1913 – South Africa
Stasimopus robertsi Hewitt, 1910 – South Africa
Stasimopus rufidens (Ausserer, 1871) – South Africa
Stasimopus schoenlandi Pocock, 1900 – South Africa
Stasimopus schreineri Purcell, 1903 – South Africa
Stasimopus schultzei Purcell, 1908 – South Africa
Stasimopus spinipes Hewitt, 1917 – South Africa
Stasimopus spinosus Hewitt, 1914 – South Africa
Stasimopus steynsburgensis Hewitt, 1915 – South Africa
Stasimopus suffuscus Hewitt, 1916 – South Africa
Stasimopus tysoni Hewitt, 1919 – South Africa
Stasimopus umtaticus Purcell, 1903 – South Africa
Stasimopus u. rangeri Hewitt, 1927 – South Africa
Stasimopus unispinosus Purcell, 1903 – South Africa

In synonymy:
S. dubius Hewitt, 1913 = Stasimopus robertsi Hewitt, 1910

References

Further reading

Mygalomorphae genera
Spiders of Africa
Stasimopidae
Taxa named by Eugène Simon